Arie Bijvoet ( – ) was a Dutch footballer.

Club career
Bijvoet was a midfielder who played for DFC and Kampong.

International career
He was part of the Netherlands national football team, playing 1 match on 20 April 1913 against Belgium.

Personal life
Arie Bijvoet married Irena Neeckx in 1919. She died in 1970. Arie Bijvoet was in the military.

See also
 List of Dutch international footballers

References

External links
 Genealogy and biography of Arie Bijvoet 

1891 births
1976 deaths
Footballers from Leeuwarden
Dutch footballers
Netherlands international footballers
FC Dordrecht players
Association football midfielders